Lithodes galapagensis is a species of king crab described in 2009 that lives around the Galapagos Islands,  where known from depths of .

References

King crabs
Crustaceans of the eastern Pacific Ocean
Galápagos Islands coastal fauna
Crustaceans described in 2009